Keena Ruth Rothhammer (born February 26, 1957) is an American former competition swimmer, Olympic champion, and former world record-holder in two events.

Rothhammer was born in Little Rock, Arkansas, and is Jewish.

Swimming career
As a teenager, she grew up in Santa Clara, California, and trained with the Santa Clara Swim Club in Santa Clara under the coach George Haines, who was noted for leading U.S. Olympic swimmers during the 1960s and 1970s.

As a 15-year-old, Rothhammer represented the United States at the 1972 Summer Olympics in Munich, Germany. She won the gold medal in the women's 800-meter freestyle and set a new world record in the event twice, on successive days. She also won the bronze medal in the women's 200-meter freestyle at the 1972 Olympics. At the 1973 World Aquatics Championships, she won the 200-meter freestyle and finished second in the 400-meter freestyle. The same year, she was named North American Athlete of the Year.

She was inducted into the International Swimming Hall of Fame as an "Honor Swimmer" in 1991.

See also

 List of Olympic medalists in swimming (women)
 List of select Jewish swimmers
 List of University of Southern California people
 List of World Aquatics Championships medalists in swimming (women)
 World record progression 400 metres freestyle
 World record progression 800 metres freestyle

References

External links

 Keena Rothhammer – Jews in Sports profile

1957 births
Living people
American female freestyle swimmers
World record setters in swimming
Jewish American sportspeople
Jewish swimmers
Olympic bronze medalists for the United States in swimming
Olympic gold medalists for the United States in swimming
Sportspeople from Little Rock, Arkansas
Sportspeople from Arkansas
Swimmers at the 1972 Summer Olympics
Medalists at the 1972 Summer Olympics
University of Southern California alumni
World Aquatics Championships medalists in swimming
21st-century American Jews
21st-century American women